Monotheist is a death metal band from Orlando, Florida. Former vocalist JJ Polachek is in the bands 7 Horns 7 Eyes and Ovid's Withering, of which, 7H7E, ranked their album on No. 1 on Metalsucks.com by Vince Neilsteins' Top 15 albums, and therefore stated that Monotheist is very similar to 7 Horns 7 Eyes. In 2016, the band released a demo, "Scion of Darkness" for their debut album that was to be released in the summer of 2016 via SkyBurnsBlack Records.

The band released their debut studio album, Scourge, on March 16, 2018.

In January 2019, the band announced that Cooper Bates replaced Shiv on vocals, and Chris Stropoli joined on drums.

Members
Current
 Cooper Bates – vocals (2019–present), drums (2012–2019)
 Mike "Prophet" Moore – guitars, vocals (2004–present)
 Jose Figueroa – bass (2013–present)
 Tyler McDaniel – guitars, vocals (2013–present)
 Chris Stropoli – drums (2019–present)
Past
 JJ "Shiv" Polachek VI – vocals (2008–2019)
 Elyssa Noel – bass, vocals (2004–2009)
 Eirek Eichel – drums (2004–2008)
 Isaac Kaplan – guitars
 Xander Rodriguez – guitars
 Anthony Wert – guitars, vocals (2008–2009)
 Jake Rice – vocals (2004-2008)
 Christian Martinez – guitars (2012–2013)

Discography
Albums
 Scourge (2018)
Demos
 Unforsaken (2007)
EP
 Genesis of Perdition (2013)
Singles
 "Scion of Darkness" (January 30, 2016)

References

Musical groups established in 2004
American progressive metal musical groups
Musical groups from Orlando, Florida
American deathcore musical groups